Presidential elections were held in Mongolia on 20 May 2001. The result was a victory for incumbent Natsagiin Bagabandi, who won 59.2% of the vote. Voter turnout was 82.9%.

Results

References

Mongolia
2001 in Mongolia
Presidential elections in Mongolia
May 2001 events in Asia